Hammond–Whiting station is an Amtrak intercity train station in Hammond, Indiana. The station is along the former Pennsylvania Railroad Fort Wayne Line, now owned by Norfolk Southern Railway. North of the station lies the former Baltimore and Ohio (now CSX) and Elgin, Joliet and Eastern Railroad (now Canadian National) tracks. The station building and parking lot lies on the former New York Central Railroad mainline. Hammond–Whiting opened on September 11, 1982. Until the early 2000s, it was served by all Amtrak service that ran east from Chicago; today, it is only served by two daily Wolverine round trips.

History

Opening
After the success of 1953-opened Route 128 station in the southern area of Greater Boston, railroads began to add suburban park-and-ride stops for intercity trains as complements to downtown stations. Penn Central opened Capital Beltway station in 1970 and Metropark station in 1971, providing suburban stops for Washington, D.C. and New York City. However, at the beginning of the 1980s, Chicago did not have such a stop for Amtrak intercity trains running to Michigan and the East Coast – most trains did not stop until Gary, South Bend, Valparaiso, or Niles.

Indiana Representative Adam Benjamin Jr., chairman of the House Appropriations Subcommittee on Transportation, induced Amtrak to add a suburban station southeast of Chicago. Located in Whiting (at a location that had not previously had a railroad station) but co-named for larger Hammond, Indiana, Hammond–Whiting station opened on September 12, 1982. It was initially served by ten daily round trips: the Calumet and Indiana Connection commuter trains; the International Limited, Lake Cities, Twilight Limited, and Wolverine services to Michigan; and the Broadway Limited, Capitol Limited, Cardinal, and Lake Shore Limited long-distance trains.

For the next two decades, the station was served by all Amtrak service on the line. The Pere Marquette began on August 5, 1984; the Cardinal was rerouted to the southwest on April 27, 1986. The Indiana Connection was discontinued on January 10, 1986, followed by the Calumet on May 6, 1991. The Broadway Limited was replaced by the Three Rivers on September 10, 1995. The Pennsylvanian was extended to Chicago with a stop at Hammond–Whiting on November 7, 1998.

Service reductions

The station was built cheaply, using a standard Amtrak design. The single side platform serves only one of the line's three tracks; this caused operational difficulties with routing numerous daily Amtrak trains onto that single track. Amtrak began reducing service to the station in the early 2000s because of low ridership and Norfolk Southern's requests due to the operational issues. On October 29, 2000, the Wolverine stop at Hammond–Whiting was discontinued. The Pere Marquette and International ceased stopping on April 29, 2001, followed by the Capitol Limited on July 9.

The Pennsylvanian was cut back to Pittsburgh on February 10, 2003. The Lake Shore Limited stop was discontinued on April 28, 2003, as the train averaged just five passengers per train at Hammond–Whiting, but the Capitol Limited stop was re-added. The Three Rivers was cut on March 7, 2005. The station lost its ticket agent on April 25, 2005, when the Capitol Limited again ceased to stop. This left only two daily Wolverine round trips (the former Lake Cities and Twilight Limited, renamed on April 26, 2004) as the only service at Hammond–Whiting. In 2011, Amtrak considered stopping the Lake Shore Limited at the station; however, it was rejected due to operational difficulties and low projected ridership.

See also
Hammond station (South Shore Line)

References

External links

Hammond–Whiting, IN – USA Rail Guide (TrainWeb)

Amtrak stations in Indiana
Hammond, Indiana

Railway stations in Lake County, Indiana
Railway stations in the United States opened in 1982
1982 establishments in Indiana